Z. M. Jack Stell Field  is a city-owned public-use airport located five nautical miles (6 mi, 9 km) northeast of the central business district of Crossett, in Ashley County, Arkansas, United States.

This airport is included in the FAA's National Plan of Integrated Airport Systems for 2011–2015, which categorized it as a general aviation facility.

Facilities and aircraft 
Z. M. Jack Stell Field covers an area of 126 acres (51 ha) at an elevation of 184 feet (56 m) above mean sea level. It has one runway designated 5/23 with an asphalt surface measuring 5,009 by 75 feet (1,527 x 23 m).

For the 12-month period ending March 31, 2010, the airport had 15,095 aircraft operations, an average of 41 per day: 99% general aviation, 1% military, and <1% air taxi. At that time there were 9 aircraft based at this airport: 89% single-engine and 11% multi-engine.

References

External links 
 Aerial image as of 28 February 2000 from USGS The National Map
 

Airports in Arkansas
Transportation in Ashley County, Arkansas